The Blair House Agreement was the November 1992 agreement between the United States and the European Union on export subsidy and domestic subsidy reduction commitments in the Uruguay Round of multilateral trade negotiations. The agreement also dealt with some bilateral agricultural trade issues.

See also
 Blair House
 European Union–United States relations

References
 

1992 in the United States
1992 in international relations
1992 in economics
Agriculture in Europe
Agricultural marketing in the United States
European Union and agriculture
United States–European Union relations
Treaties of the United States
Treaties of the European Union